Bruno Alexandre dos Santos Patacas (born 30 November 1977) is a Portuguese retired footballer who played as a right back.

After starting his career with Sporting CP, he went to represent other clubs before settling with Nacional, where he remained for nearly one decade whilst appearing in almost 300 competitive matches.

Club career
A Sporting CP youth graduate, Patacas was born in Vila Franca de Xira, Lisbon, and spent his first professional season with farm team S.C. Lourinhanense, not being very successful upon his return to the alma mater (three games during parts of 1997–98 and four more in the following, while also spending time at Lourinhanense).

Patacas was released after one more loan stint, with C.D. Santa Clara, moving on to S.C. Campomaiorense – both these sides were also in the Primeira Liga– and then C.D. Nacional in the 2002–03 campaign, being an undisputed starter and often the only Portuguese player in the latter's starting XI, in a squad filled with Brazilians. He was also eventually awarded club captaincy.

In 2007, a transfer was almost arranged with PFC CSKA Sofia, but Patacas ultimately stayed at the Estádio da Madeira. He totalled a further 55 league appearances over the following two seasons for the Madeirans, and qualified to the UEFA Europa League in the second.

At the end of 2010–11, Patacas announced his retirement due to injuries, at the age of 33. He was immediately appointed Nacional's director of football, leaving his position on 12 September 2015.

Personal life
Patacas' brother-in-law, Luís Pinto, was also a footballer.

References

External links

1977 births
Living people
People from Vila Franca de Xira
Portuguese footballers
Association football defenders
Primeira Liga players
Liga Portugal 2 players
Segunda Divisão players
Sporting CP footballers
C.D. Santa Clara players
S.C. Campomaiorense players
C.D. Nacional players
Portugal youth international footballers
Portugal under-21 international footballers
Sportspeople from Lisbon District